Type I inositol-1,4,5-trisphosphate 5-phosphatase is an enzyme that in humans is encoded by the INPP5A gene.

The protein encoded by this gene is a membrane-associated type I inositol 1,4,5-trisphosphate (InsP3) 5-phosphatase. InsP3 5-phosphatases hydrolyze Ins(1,4,5)P3, which mobilizes intracellular calcium and acts as a second messenger mediating cell responses to various stimulation.

References

Further reading